London Buses route 176 is a Transport for London contracted bus route in London, England. Running between Penge and Tottenham Court Road station, it is operated by London Central.

History

Upon being re-tendered, the route was retained by Arriva London with a new contract commencing on 14 November 2003.

On 3 January 2009 the route was withdrawn between Tottenham Court Road and Oxford Circus to allow Andrew Borde Street to be closed and used as a work site for the upgrade of Tottenham Court Road station and the construction of the Crossrail station. In January 2010, Transport for London claimed this shortening of route 176 as part of its implementation of the Mayor's request to reduce the bus flow in Oxford Street by 10% in each of 2009 and 2010.

Current route
Route 176 operates via these primary locations:
Penge Pawleyne Arms
Penge West station  
Sydenham Cobb's Corner for Sydenham station  
Forest Hill station  
Horniman Museum 
Dulwich Library
East Dulwich station 
Denmark Hill station  
King's College Hospital
Camberwell Green
Walworth
Elephant & Castle station  
St George's Circus
Waterloo station  
South Bank
Waterloo Bridge
Aldwych
Charing Cross station  
Leicester Square station 
Cambridge Circus
Tottenham Court Road station

References

External links

Bus routes in London
Transport in the London Borough of Bromley
Transport in the London Borough of Camden
Transport in the London Borough of Lambeth
Transport in the London Borough of Southwark
Transport in the City of Westminster